Chunar Junction railway station (station code:- CAR) is on the DDU–Kanpur section of the Howrah-New Delhi Main Line. A single electrified line goes for Chopan of the Sonbhadra district of Uttar Pradesh.   It is located in Mirzapur district of the Indian state of Uttar Pradesh. It serves Chunar and the surrounding areas.

History
The Howrah–Delhi line of East Indian Railway Company was ready up to Naini in 1864 and after the Old Naini Bridge was completed through trains started running in 1865–66.

The  -long  broad gauge Chunar–Chopan line was constructed in 1954.

Electrification
The Dagmagpur–Cheoki section was electrified in 1965–66.

References

External links
Trains at Chunar

Railway stations in Mirzapur district
Allahabad railway division
1864 establishments in India